The discography of Little Texas, an American country music band, consists of six studio albums, four compilation albums, one live album and 20 singles. The band made its first chart entry in 1991 with "Some Guys Have All the Love", from their album First Time for Everything. Counting this song, Little Texas charted eight songs within the top 10 of Hot Country Songs, including a number one with "My Love".

Studio albums

1990s albums

2000s–2010s albums

Compilation albums

Live albums

Singles

As a featured artist

Other charted songs

Videography

Music videos

Guest appearances

Notes

References

Country music discographies
Discographies of American artists